Huayu is a town of Jinxiang County, Shandong, China. , it has 46 villages under its administration.

References

Township-level divisions of Shandong
Jinxiang County